Catholic education may refer to:

 Catholic school, primary and secondary education organised by the Catholic Church or organisations affiliated with it
 Catholic university, private university run by the Catholic Church or organisations affiliated with it
 Seminary, a theology based graduate schools for students who become Catholic priests
 Convent, a religious educational institution for female Catholic monastics such as nuns
 Doctor of Sacred Theology, an academic degree in Catholic theology
 Doctor of Canon Law is an academic degree earned by students who specialise in interpreting Canon law of the Catholic Church

See also 
 Catholic education in Australia
 Anglican education in Australia
 History of Catholic education in the United States